Jamel Dean (born October 15, 1996) is an American football cornerback for the Tampa Bay Buccaneers of the National Football League (NFL). He played college football at Auburn.

College career
After spending a semester at Ohio State while medically disqualified, Dean announced that he would transfer to Auburn in May 2015.  Following his sophomore year at Auburn where he had 43 tackles and eight pass breakups, Dean was named to Bruce Feldman's college football freaks list.  On December 29, 2018, Dean announced that he would forgo his final year of eligibility and declare for the 2019 NFL Draft.

Professional career

Tampa Bay Buccaneers
Dean was drafted by the Tampa Bay Buccaneers in the third round with the 94th overall pick in the 2019 NFL Draft.

2019 season
Dean made his regular season debut in Week 9 against the Seattle Seahawks during a 40–34 loss in which he recorded six tackles and four pass deflections but gave up 3 touchdowns.
In Week 10 against the Arizona Cardinals, Dean recorded 4 pass deflections and his first career interception off fellow rookie Kyler Murray in the 30–27 win. In Week 12 against the Atlanta Falcons, Dean recorded five pass deflections in a 35–22 win. In Week 16, during a 23–20 loss to the Houston Texans, Dean had one tackle, one pass deflection, and an interception off Deshaun Watson.

Dean finished his rookie season with 21 tackles, 17 pass deflections, two interceptions, and one forced fumble.

2020
In Week 6 against the Green Bay Packers, Dean intercepted a pass thrown by Aaron Rodgers and returned it 32 yards for a touchdown during the 38–10 win.  This was Dean's first interception of the season and his first career pick six. Dean also became only the third player ever to record a pick-six off Rodgers, joining Tanard Jackson and William Jackson III as the only players to accomplish the rare feat. Overall, Dean finished the 2020 season with 62 total tackles, one interception, and seven passes defended in 14 games.

Dean played in all four games in the Buccaneers' playoff run that resulted in the team winning Super Bowl LV.

On March 15, 2023, Dean signed a four-year, $52 million contract extension with the Buccaneers.

NFL career statistics

Buccaneers franchise records

Rookie records 
Most pass deflections by a rookie – 17

References

External links
Auburn Tigers bio
Tampa Bay Buccaneers bio

1996 births
Living people
American football cornerbacks
Auburn Tigers football players
Players of American football from Florida
People from Cocoa, Florida
Tampa Bay Buccaneers players